Lomatocarpa is a genus of flowering plants belonging to the family Apiaceae.

Its native range is Afghanistan to Central Asia and Pakistan.

Species:

Lomatocarpa albomarginata 
Lomatocarpa multivittata 
Lomatocarpa steineri

References

Apioideae
Apioideae genera